The Ambassador of Australia to Nepal is an officer of the Australian Department of Foreign Affairs and Trade and the head of the Embassy of the Commonwealth of Australia to the Federal Democratic Republic of Nepal. The ambassador resides in Kathmandu. The position has the rank and status of an Ambassador Extraordinary and Plenipotentiary and is currently held by Felicity Volk since 19 March 2021.

Between 1960 and 1986, Australian representation was carried out by a non-resident Ambassador based in the Australian High Commission in New Delhi. The Australian Embassy in Kathmandu was opened on 27 April 1984, and the first ambassador appointed in May 1986. According to the Australian Government, the diplomatic mission was opened to improve consular services for Australians in Nepal and to facilitate the delivery of the Australian aid program to the country.

List of heads of mission

See also
Australia–Nepal relations

References

External links

Australian Embassy Nepal

 
Nepal
Australia